The 2011 Wonderful Pistachios 400 was a NASCAR Sprint Cup Series stock car race held on September 10, 2011, at Richmond International Raceway in Richmond, Virginia.

Contested over 400 laps, it was the 26th race of the 2011 season and the final race before the 2011 Chase for the Sprint Cup. The race was won by Kevin Harvick for the Richard Childress Racing team. Carl Edwards finished second, and Jeff Gordon clinched third. For only the second time in modern-Sprint Cup history, an event was followed four days after another one. In this case, the AdvoCare 500 was held four days earlier than this event.

Summary
This race was dominated by accidents both involving single cars and multiple cars. Each green flag run averaged almost 20 laps while more than 21% of the race would be held under a caution flag. Kevin Harvick would dominate a good portion of the race while Jeff Gordon had a reasonable chance to win the race between laps 378 and 384. Scott Speed was the last-place finisher of the race due to a crash on lap 7. Despite Paul Menard's awful finish, he was the last driver to finish the race without any mechanical issues.

Juan Pablo Montoya's 15th-place finish and Marcos Ambrose's 21st-place finish were respectable finishes for the token foreigners in the NASCAR Sprint Cup Series. According to the gambling pundits, Kyle Busch was the mostly likely to win prior to the checkered flag while Ambrose, Regan Smith and Bobby Labonte were the three dark horses of the event.

Each finisher was given a different amount of money as his/her individual winnings. These winnings were given out in addition to the driver's weekly salary as a part of a multi-car team. While Kevin Harvick received $256,736 for his valiant effort ($ when considering inflation), last-place driver Scott Speed received a meager $66,860 ($ when considering inflation).

Top ten finishers

Timeline
 The Voice of Sarge in Toy Story R. Lee Ermey gives the command to start engines
 Start of race: Jamie McMurray led the Racing grid as the green flag was waved
 Lap 20: Jimmie Johnson took over the lead from Jamie McMurray
 Lap 58: Kevin Harvick took over the lead from Jimmie Johnson
 Lap 59: Matt Kenseth took over the lead from Kevin Harvick
 Lap 74: Kevin Harvick took over the lead from Matt Kenseth
 Lap 157: Greg Biffle took over the lead from Kevin Harvick
 Lap 163: Kevin Harvick took over the lead from Greg Biffle
 Lap 202: Carl Edwards took over the lead from Kevin Harvick
 Lap 315: Kevin Harvick took over the lead from Carl Edwards
 Lap 378: Jeff Gordon took over the lead from Kevin Harvick
 Lap 385: Kevin Harvick took over the lead from Jeff Gordon
 Finish: Kevin Harvick was officially declared the winner of the event

Championship standings

References

Wonderful Pistachios 400
Wonderful Pistachios 400
NASCAR races at Richmond Raceway
September 2011 sports events in the United States